Vasile Gherasim (27 January 1950 – 7 November 2020) was a Romanian politician who served as mayor of Sector 1 of Bucharest from 2000 to 2004 and as Deputy from 2008 to 2012. 

He was born in Moinești, Bacău County. In 2005 he was awarded by then-President Traian Băsescu the National Order of Faithful Service, knight rank.

Gherasim died from COVID-19 in Bucharest on 7 November 2020, at age 70, during the COVID-19 pandemic in Romania.

References

1950 births
2020 deaths
People from Moinești
Mayors of the sectors of Bucharest
Members of the Chamber of Deputies (Romania)
Democratic Liberal Party (Romania) politicians
Deaths from the COVID-19 pandemic in Romania
Recipients of the National Order of Faithful Service